Risala Bazaar is a suburb in Hyderabad, Telangana, India.

Transport
It has good connectivity of buses by TSRTC. The local train is connected through MMTS.

References

Neighbourhoods in Hyderabad, India
Cities and towns in Hyderabad district, India